Howe is a small village and civil parish in the Hambleton District of North Yorkshire, England. The population of the civil parish was estimated at 20 in 2015.

Howe, from the Old Norse word haugr, is a Middle English topographic name for a small hill or a man-made mound or barrow.  Howe was historically a township in the ancient parish of Pickhill with Roxby in the North Riding of Yorkshire.  At the time of the Domesday Book in 1086 it belonged to Count Alan of Brittany.  In the Middle Ages the manor belonged to St Leonard's Hospital, York.   Howe became a separate civil parish in 1866.

References

Villages in North Yorkshire
Civil parishes in North Yorkshire